King George V Memorial Park, Hong Kong is an urban park in Sai Ying Pun and one of the few parks in Hong Kong bearing the former colonial links to the territory's past.

The park contains a basketball court, a hard surface football ground, sitting out areas, a public toilet, and a child care centre. Access is available from Eastern Street and Hospital Road.

Sai Ying Pun Community Complex is located near the park.

History
There are two King George V Memorial Parks in Hong Kong. One is on the Hong Kong Island while the other is located in Jordan, Kowloon.

In 1936, following the death of King George V, parks were planned for both the city of Victoria on Hong Kong Island, in the garden of and the site of one of the wings of the Civil Hospital, and one on Canton Road in Kowloon, both to be paid for by public subscription.

In June 1941, the Memorial Park in Kowloon, King George V Memorial Park, Kowloon, was opened; it is located beside Canton Road.  Administrator Norman Lockhart Smith hosted the ceremony for this park.  It had a statue of King George V in the centre of the park. During the Japanese occupation, facilities were destroyed. Three Chinese styled kiosks were built after World War II.  In 1941, King George V Memorial Park, originally planned as King George's Field, adjacent the old Civil Hospital in Hong Kong, had yet to be built.

West Island Line construction

In March 2004, the MTR changed the planned location of the Sai Ying Pun station east and south of the initial alignment to an area deep under King George V Memorial Park. A source from MTR Corporation Limited (MTRCL) revealed to the local newspaper Ming Pao that this location was chosen to avoid any nuisance during works under major roads. The location would also better serve Mid-Levels residents, the MTR said. Part of the park was closed temporarily to the public for the duration of construction.

Gallery
The photos of the gallery was taken in the King George V Memorial Park on Hong Kong Island.

See also
List of urban public parks and gardens in Hong Kong
Great George Street, Hong Kong
King George V School
Hong Kong Zoological and Botanical Gardens has a statue of George VI
Victoria Park (Hong Kong) has a statue of Queen Victoria
King George V Memorial Park, Kowloon

References

External links
 

Sai Ying Pun
Urban public parks and gardens in Hong Kong